Vyacheslav Aleksandrovich Komarov (born January 31, 1950) is a Russian professional football coach and a former player.

In 2006, he was involved in a serious car crash, which he barely survived.

External links
 Career summary by KLISF

References

1950 births
Living people
Soviet footballers
SC Tavriya Simferopol players
Russian football managers
Russian expatriate football managers
Expatriate football managers in Ukraine
FC Kuban Krasnodar managers
Russian expatriate sportspeople in Kazakhstan
FC Krymteplytsia Molodizhne managers
Association football forwards
PFC Spartak Nalchik players